Abraham Minero Fernández (born 22 February 1986), known simply as Abraham, is a Spanish professional footballer who plays for CD Ebro as a left-back.

Club career
Born in Granollers, Barcelona, Catalonia, Abraham played amateur football well into his 20s. He first arrived in the Segunda División B in 2008, joining UE Sant Andreu.

On 6 August 2010, Abraham signed a one-year deal with FC Barcelona B of Segunda División. He played his first match as a professional late in the month, coming on as a second-half substitute in a 2–1 away win against RC Celta de Vigo.

On 6 June 2011, Abraham was released by the Catalans and joined La Liga side Real Zaragoza on 2 July, for three years. He made his debut in the competition on 28 August, starting in the 0–6 home loss to Real Madrid.

On 4 March 2012, Abraham scored his first professional goal, in the 93rd minute for a 2–1 home victory over Villarreal CF. On 27 February of the following year he renewed his contract with the Aragonese club, running until 2017.

Abraham appeared in 35 matches in his second season, which ended in relegation. On 2 August 2014 he moved to SD Eibar, recently promoted to the top flight, in a season-long loan.

After returning to Zaragoza, Abraham moved to Levante UD on 7 July 2016 in a one-year loan deal. On 6 July of the following year, he signed a permanent two-year contract with Gimnàstic de Tarragona also of the second tier.

On 27 June 2019, after suffering relegation, Abraham agreed to a two-year deal at Racing de Santander who had just returned to the second division.

Career statistics

Club

Honours
Levante
Segunda División: 2016–17

References

External links
Real Zaragoza official profile 

1986 births
Living people
Footballers from Granollers
Spanish footballers
Association football defenders
La Liga players
Segunda División players
Segunda División B players
Tercera División players
Segunda Federación players
EC Granollers players
UE Figueres footballers
CF Peralada players
UE Sant Andreu footballers
FC Barcelona Atlètic players
Real Zaragoza players
SD Eibar footballers
Levante UD footballers
Gimnàstic de Tarragona footballers
Racing de Santander players
Lleida Esportiu footballers
CD Ebro players